Sanwell Chirume (6 August 1941) is a Zimbabwean sculptor. His work, though derived to an extent from that of the Shona people, is highly personal in nature.  Chirume lives and works at the Tengenenge Sculpture Community — his artistic output may be found in the collections of the Chapungu Sculpture Park.

References

External links
Biographical sketch

Year of birth missing (living people)
Living people
Zimbabwean sculptors
21st-century sculptors